Sirex cyaneus (blue horntail) is a species of horntail in the genus Sirex. Native to forests in Alberta, they grow to 2 cm in length.

References

Siricidae
Insects described in 1781
Hymenoptera of North America